The Hong Kong National Security Law is a piece of national security legislation passed on 30 June 2020 which countered the anti-extradition bill protests in  2019. The law established the crimes of secession, subversion, terrorism, and collusion with foreign organisations. Implementation of the law entitles authorities to surveil, detain, search and extradite persons suspected under its provisions to Mainland China.

A few local protests took place in November 2020 but there were no large-scale demonstrations in threat of the national security law. The detainment of Joshua Wong, Agnes Chow and Ivan Lam on 23 November aroused some attention of the International community.

Western countries started sanctions on China and Hong Kong officials and suspended agreements with Hong Kong, notably the Surrender of Fugitive Offenders.

What follows is a timeline of protests beginning on November 3, 2020.

3 November

Canada considering large-scale evacuation 
Against the implementation of Hong Kong national security law, Jeff Nankivell, Consul general of Canada in Hong Kong and Macau reminded Canadians the situation in Hong Kong had changed when participating in a meeting of Canada House of Commons Canada and China relations special committee. After the introduction of the law, the consulate had held several meetings to brief Canada enterprises and nationals about the changed situation. Although it considered the mass unrest appearing in Hong Kong to be small, it said that it provided resources and capabilities to evacuate at a larger-scale when needed.

2 November

Carrie Lam addresses the United States 
On the day of the 2020 United States presidential election, Hong Kong Chief Executive Carrie Lam expressed in a press conference she hoped the next US president could reconsider the relationship with Hong Kong comprehensively and not perform arbitrarily actions that suppress Hong Kong.

Hong Kong Telecom staff sentenced to 2 years in prison for doxxing police officers 
A 33-year-old male technician of Hong Kong Telecom was accused of uploading personal information of police officers and their family members to Telegram channel "Dad Find Boy". He was convicted of three "access to computer with criminal or dishonest intent" charges and one "offence for disclosing personal data obtained without consent from data users", and sentenced to two years in prison.

Hong Kong Connection journalist investigating 721 Yuen Long attack arrested 

Freelance journalist Bao Choy, who filmed a Hong Kong Connection episode about the 2019 Yuen Long attack, was arrested. She was charged with misusing a government vehicle licensing database and making false statements to obtain information and records about car owners after trying to discover the owners of a few vehicles suspected of supplying weapons to the attackers. The owners of cars were identified as rural village leaders. She checked a box to declare that the vehicle registration searches were for "other traffic and transport related matters". Other options available when accessing the database were ‘legal proceedings’ and ‘sale and purchase of vehicles’. While the previously available option ‘other purposes’ had been scrapped, the magistrate said that Choy should have considered other means to obtain the information. The police dismissed allegations that the arrest was an attack on press freedom.

4 November

Human rights lawyer Lu Siwei investigated 
Sichuan human rights lawyer Lu Siwei received a notification from the local justice bureau demanding that his law firm hand over all his cases for investigation. Sources said this was related to Lu's handling of the 12 Hongkongers case and that the authorities wanted to force him to quit handling the case.

HKBUSUEB journalist charged with obstructing police officers and resisting arrest 
The Students' Union Editorial Board at Hong Kong Baptist University stated that one of its journalists had the previous night been formally charged with obstructing police officers and resisting arrest when interviewing at a "Lunch with you" protest in Central held on 8 May. He was to appear in court on 6 November. At the May protest, police officers thought that Tang – who according to the editorial board was wearing a press pass –  looked suspicious. He was said to have ignored police requests to have his bag checked and show his identity card, and shouted emotionally (in Cantonese)  "Is it illegal to take pictures?". The police asked him to stay calm, or he would be arrested for misbehavior in public places. He was arrested later. The prosecution said he had struggled fiercely when being arrested. A reporter of Hong Kong Free Press who was present at the scene heard Tang shouting that he had been beaten.

Congressional-Executive Commission on China criticised the human rights condition after the passage of Hong Kong national security law 
Congressional-Executive Commission on China published a human rights condition analysis concerning Hong Kong after the passage of Hong Kong national security law, which criticised the HKSAR government of using the law for excessive arrest and encroaching the rights and freedom of Hongkongers, ignoring the guarantee of Hongkongers having the rights listed in International Covenant on Civil and Political Rights as written in the Basic Law.

5 November

National Security Department reporting hotline launched 
Hong Kong police announced the launch of "National Security Department reporting hotline" on their Facebook page. Citizens could make related non-urgent reports through Wechat, SMS, or email, while the phone hotline would not answer any incoming calls and replies. Police announced later that they had received over 1000 messages as at 6 pm. James To worried that the reporting hotline would cause distrust among people, "encouraging Cultural Revolution-styled struggling". Icarus Wong, member of the organisation "Civil Rights Observer" said the hotline might cause a culture of reporting each other, just like during the Cultural Revolution, making citizens afraid of being recorded and reported to the police when discussing current events in public places, triggering a chilling effect in society.

CUHK alleged a poster of its student union to be in violation of the law 
The CUHK students' union planned to hold an "Anniversary of the siege of CUHK" exhibition, with its posters showing pictures of the siege and head sculptures of CUHK principal Rocky Tuan and the former principal Joseph Sung. CUHK issued a statement, accusing the posters of being illegal and improperly using avatars, and urging the event organiser to modify or remove the posters immediately to avoid breaking the law.

Dominic Raab replied politicians' letter concerning 12 Hongkongers 
Over 60 British parliament members and politicians lettered foreign secretary Dominic Raab on 22 October, urging the UK negotiate with China and demand the release of the 12 Hongkongers.

Hong Kong Watch posted Raab's reply on 5 November, who said in the letter that the British government was paying close attention to the situation of the 12 Hongkongers, and was concerned about the situation of them not being able to contact their family members and their lawyers rejected for visits. Meanwhile, British officials in Hong Kong had mentioned the incident several times to the Hong Kong and central governments, requesting a guarantee that the 12 Hongkongers would be treated fairly. He also mentioned human rights and freedom indemnified by Sino-British Joint Declaration, which must be defended.

6 November

Carrie Lam accused of violation of law in response to RTHK Hong Kong Connection 
When the Chief Executive Carrie Lam met with the media, regarding the arrest of journalist Bao Choy on 3 November, she said that it was inconvenient to comment on the case because it entered the judicial process. She also pointed out that Hong Kong is a place where things are done in accordance with the law, and journalists must abide by the law. When asked about handling affairs in accordance with the law, a Legislative Council document pointed out that the Transport Department had no legal powers to request an explanation of the reason for applying for a license check, as Bao Choy had done. However, the government had used administrative means to cancel the "other" use option. In response, Lam pointed out that since the case may lead to judicial challenges in the future, no further explanation will be given.

Four police associations issued an open letter to CUHK President Rocky Tuan 
Four police associationsSuperintendents Association, Hong Kong Police Inspectors' Association, Overseas Inspectors Association, and Junior Police Associationissued an open letter to Chinese University of Hong Kong President Rocky Tuan, criticizing him for publicly questioning the police for only one-sided statements from the arrested students. Including the mention of a female student of the CUHK who was allegedly subjected to sexual violence by the police, 'with a big talk, with a wrong preface,' with the purpose of slandering the police and inciting hatred. At the same time, the letter asserted that Tuan's open letter last year had a 'causal relationship' with the fierce conflict on the second bridge of CUHK, and that he needed to bear part of the responsibility for the escalation.

7 November

PolyU, CityU, HKBU tighten access control 
On the one-year anniversary of siege of Hong Kong Polytechnic University, a letter was sent to all teachers and students stating that access to the campus would be tightened in the following weeks. With immediate effect and until 30 November, only faculty and students would be allowed to enter the campus, with evidence required to prove the need. Visitors who enter the campus and have been 'specially approved' by the dean of the department or the Office of Student Affairs would also be able to enter the campus. In its reply to HK01, PolyU pointed out that taking into account the incident on campus in November 2019, the school decided to enhance campus access management measures. In addition, CityU also replied to HK01 that in February 2020, the school completed the installation of an electronic access system and enhanced security measures on the campus, and faculty, current students, alumni and visitors from various departments can present valid identities Enter the campus after the supporting documents; the Baptist University stated that in response to the social incidents that occurred at the end of 2019, the school had strengthened its security measures on the campus, including teachers and students must show their IDs or snap cards when entering the campus, and visitors must obtain relevant information when entering the university. The department verifies the purpose and identity of the visit and registers when entering the campus.

8 November

Police raised purple banner on first anniversary of Chow Tsz-lok's death 
On the first anniversary of the death of 22-year-old Hong Kong University of Science and Technology student Chow Tsz-lok, a large number of citizens went to the car park Tseung Kwan O to mourn and lay flowers at night. A large number of Tactical Police officers were on guard around the road and in the parking lot, and repeatedly opened microphones to warn those present or violated the gathering restriction order, and asked citizens to leave the scene after completing their mourning. Later, the police officers claimed that they wanted to implement crowd control and set up a cordon in front of the altar for a time. At 8 pm, it was originally planned to hold a silent mourning ceremony, but after someone chanted Liberate Hong Kong, Revolution of our Times, the police officers ran across the road and raised a purple flag to warn that the slogan might violate the Hong Kong national security law.

9 November

831 Wan Chai riots case: Department of Justice is dissatisfied with the ruling and appeals 
The Department of Justice filed an appeal against the eight defendants regarding clashes with police in Wan Chai on the night of 31 August 2019. The letter stated that the department was dissatisfied with the decision of District Court Judge Sham Siu-man, who they believed did not adequately and fully consider and analyze all the evidence.

Four members who had been disqualified from running for election were reported in Beijing 
It is reported from the establishment circles that the Standing Committee of the National People's Congress will revoke the qualifications of four democratic legislators, including the Civic Party Alvin Yeung, Dennis Kwok, Kwok Ka-ki and Kenneth Leung. In the original September Legislative Council election, the four people were revoked by the Returning Officer for dishonestly supporting the Hong Kong Basic Law. At that time, the National People's Congress did not require the extended members to take the oath again. The four and other pan-democratic parties continue to stay. According to i-Cable News, TVB and HK01, the four may be deprived of membership due to violations of the Basic Law. Now News Channel quoted sources as saying that the decision of the Standing Committee of the National People's Congress will only touch on principles.

The pan-democratic lawmakers met with reporters in response to the disqualification rumors after a meeting on Monday, indicating that they had unanimously decided that if the four were disqualified, they would have no hesitation in protesting collectively. If it is implemented, not only will the route of the parliament be fully concluded, there will be no resistance in the parliament for controversial motions such as cross-border voting and Tomorrow's Lantau.

This time the National People's Congress decided to disqualify the four. It is expected that it will set forth the principles of Article 104 of the Basic Law, stating that it is impossible to hold public office and its consequences if they do not support or are not loyal to the Basic Law. Some pro-Beijing people assessed that the decision may mention the national security law, but the specific wording is unclear. Since the resumption of the Legislative Council on October 14th, the pro-democracy faction has been 'pull the future' to prevent the government from introducing overseas voting plans, including counting the number of people on multiple occasions and making three meetings. The pro-Beijing newspapers started to criticize the pan-democrats in early November and demanded to disqualify them. However, since the resumption of the meeting on 14 October, Kwok said he has not asked for a quorum at all, but it is still reported on the list.

Looking through the information, the Returning Officer pointed out that Alvin Yeung and others had sought foreign governments to interfere in the affairs of the SAR, and had no objective intent to uphold the Basic Law and allegiance to the SAR, and ruled that the nomination for election was invalid. Tan Yaozong, a member of the Standing Committee of the National People's Congress of the Hong Kong District, said before leaving for a meeting in Beijing on Monday that he noticed that the democrats were constantly interfering with the normal operation of the Legislative Council.

U.S. imposed sanctions against Chinese and Hong Kong officials 
U.S. Department of the Treasury announced sanctions against four people accused of 'involving in suppressing dissent in Hong Kong', including Li Kwai-wah, Senior Superintendent of the National Security Department of the Hong Kong Police Force, Edwina Lau, deputy director of the Police Department, Li Jiangzhou, deputy director of the National Security Agency, and deputy director of the Hong Kong and Macau Affairs Office of the State Council Deng Zhonghua. Chinese Foreign Ministry spokesperson Wang Wenbin firmly opposed and strongly condemned, and urged the U.S. to immediately stop interfering in Hong Kong affairs and immediately lift the sanctions. Hong Kong government stated it opposed the US sanctions against the four officials, which it described as a "despicable act".

Hong Kong suspends surrender of fugitive offenders and mutual legal assistance agreements with multiple countries 
The Hong Kong government announced that it had notified the Consulates General of the Netherlands and Ireland in Hong Kong respectively in accordance with the instructions of the Central Government to suspend the implementation of the agreement on the surrender of fugitive offenders and the agreement on criminal judicial assistance between Hong Kong and the two countries. A government spokesman said that while the Netherlands and Ireland have enacted relevant laws, they have unilaterally suspended the implementation of the surrender agreement with Hong Kong under the pretext of national security law. The government has expressed firm opposition to the relevant practices of the two countries, describing that the two countries have politicized judicial cooperation and undermined the basis for judicial cooperation between Hong Kong and the two countries. The government also issued notices to the French, German, and Finnish consulates, shelving the surrender agreement with France, suspending the implementation of the surrendering fugitive agreement with Germany and Finland, and suspending the implementation of the criminal judicial assistance agreement between Hong Kong and the above three countries.

11 November

Four LegCo members disqualified 

The 23rd Meeting of the Standing Committee of the 13th National People's Congress passed the Decision of the Standing Committee of the National People's Congress on the Qualifications of the Legislative Council Members of the Hong Kong Special Administrative Region on 11 November 2020, clarifying the members of LegCo, because they promote or advocating Hong Kong independence, refuse to recognize China's exercise of sovereignty over Hong Kong, seek foreign or foreign forces to interfere in the affairs of Hong Kong and the statutory requirements and conditions of loyalty to the Hong Kong government, once recognized in accordance with the law, will immediately lose the qualifications of a member of the Legislative Council.

Hong Kong government subsequently announced that Alvin Yeung, Dennis Kwok, Kwok Ka-ki and Kenneth Leung had lost their seats as LegCo members and gazetted the decision of the Standing Committee of the National People's Congress. Yeung said that he will continue to do his best for Hong Kong in his post in the future, and that he believed that Hong Kong was still full of hope in the future.

LegCo mass resignations 

In the afternoon, the remaining 15 democrats announced their resignation taking effect on 12 November. Only Civic Passion member Cheng Chung-tai and the medical constituency member Pierre Chan stated that they would stay in office, making the pro-Beijing camp became majority seats. Convener of the pro-democracy camp and the chairman of the Democratic Party, Wu Chi-wai, criticized the disqualification as "extremely absurd," saying that one country, two systems was dead. Liaison Office solemnly condemned the 15 democratic legislators of the Legislative Council for political speculation. They are destined to only ruin their political future and will not affect the progress of Hong Kong's one country, two systems.

First anniversary of the CUHK siege exhibition 

The Student Union of the Chinese University of Hong Kong initiated an exhibition on the first anniversary of Chinese University siege at the Cultural Square next to University Mall. Due to pressure from the university earlier, in order to make the exhibition proceed as scheduled, the Student Union had no choice but to cover up sensitive words in some of the exhibition panels, such as the slogan Liberate Hong Kong, Revolution of Our Times. The university stated that the exhibition gave a biased description of the events of that day and expressed extreme regret. At the same time, the university pointed to the responsibility to cooperate with law enforcement officers in entering the campus to investigate and take actions in accordance with the law. The exhibition also attracted many Chinese University lecturers, students and the public to visit.

12 November

Miles Yu interviewed by Radio Free Asia 
U.S. Secretary of State Pompeo's Chief China Policy Planning Advisor Miles Yu said in an exclusive interview with the Chinese Department of Radio Free Asia that the CCP's implementation of the national security law in Hong Kong has made the United States realize that Hong Kong's one country, two systems are only name. The decision to collectively resign is another concrete example of the CCP's stifling of Hong Kong's autonomy. The Hong Kong issue reflects the confrontation between China and the whole world. It is the CCP's abandonment of its commitment to the world. He calls Hong Kong is a victim of Chinese government policies. He also stated that no matter who enters the White House or President Trump continues to stay in office, they will not have any substantial changes to the basic points of Hong Kong policy.

13 November

Canada relaxes immigration from Hong Kong 
In response to the implementation of the Hong Kong national security law, the Canadian government announced a number of measures to facilitate the immigration of Hong Kong people to Canada, including providing a three-year open work permit for young Hong Kong people who have graduated from a tertiary college in the past five years. Those who had at least one year of work experience, met the language and education requirements, or graduated from a Canadian post-secondary education institution could directly apply for permanent residence. The relevant measures would be implemented in 2021.

March to support Bao Choy cancelled 

Hong Kong Journalists Association applied for a march on 15 November to support Bao Choy, the editor and director of RTHK Hong Kong Connection, planned to be from 10:30 am to 2:30 pm, and proceeding from Wan Chai Harbour Road Gardens to the Wan Chai Police Headquarters, the Chief Executive's Office, and finally to the Legal Center. The Chief Secretary for Administration's Office refused to approve the demonstration on the grounds of the COVID-19 pandemic. The Journalists Association expressed extreme disappointment and had no choice but to cancel the parade.

Liu Xiaoming criticizes Dennis Kwok as the enemy of one country, two systems 
The website of the Chinese Embassy in the UK announced that Liu Xiaoming met with UK Permanent Under-Secretary of the Foreign, Commonwealth and Development Office Sir Philip Barton on 13 November, and had dismissed the British side's accusations as groundless. Liu also claimed that Dennis Kwok and other members of the Hong Kong Legislative Council had disrupted the operation of the Legislative Council and even refused to recognize the state's exercise of sovereignty over Hong Kong, in contradiction to the 'One Country, Two Systems' principle and the Basic Law.

14 November

Teresa Cheng justifies the request to Beijing to disqualify lawmakers 
Secretary for Justice Teresa Cheng published a blog in which she stated that the decision made by the Standing Committee of the National People's Congress on the disqualifications of legislators has a solid legal basis. She also pointed out that if it were not for the special situation of postponing the election this year, the four members had already been ruled invalid for the nomination of the original Legislative Council elections and could not participate in the original Legislative Council elections, let alone serving as members of the Legislative Council. She stated the SAR government faced with the problem of this special constitutional order, it made a request to the Central Committee and asked the Standing Committee of the National People's Congress to make a decision.

16 November

Cause of death of Chow Tsz-lok inquiry begins 
The cause of death of Chow Tsz-lok inquest begins, and the trial period is expected to last 25 days. His father called on citizens who witnessed the incident to provide information, try to restore the truth, and let his son rest in peace. In his testimony, he stated that on the night of the incident, he had reminded his son to "be careful".

Czech Ministry of Foreign Affairs pays attention to the disqualification of legislators 
Czech Ministry of Foreign Affairs issued a statement accusing China of passing the "Decision on the Qualifications of Members of the Legislative Council of the Hong Kong Special Administrative Region" and disqualifying 4 members.

18 November

Report of former IPCC expert published 
The report written by Clifford Stott, one of the five former members of the International Expert Group of the IPCC, and other scholars including police scholar He Jiaqi, was formally published. The report pointed out that the containment strategy by police had repeatedly failed, leading to an escalation of the situation. These include the use of tear gas to disperse the Admiralty clash on 12 June outside the CITIC Building, the occupation of the Legislative Council and police retreat from the building on 1 July, a large number of riot police officers breaking into Shatin New Town Plaza on 14 July and Prince Edward station on 31 August. The attack reflects on the police's abuse of power. The attack on Yuen Long on 21 July reflects the inability of police supervision.

Yellow Factory was closed down after being accused of violating national security law 
The mask manufacturer Yellow Factory was alleged by pro-China Wen Wei Po and Ta Kung Pao that some masks were designed, packaged and decorated in an attempt to continue the struggle, poisoning young people, and were suspected of violating the national security law. The report also quoted Elizabeth Quat, a member DAB Legislative Council member, saying that the decoration of the Yellow Factory store instigated Hong Kong independence and that recovering Hong Kong and fighting the epidemic in the era is also regarded as suggestive and suspected of inciting Hong Kong independence. Yellow Factory stated on Facebook that it has no intention of violating the national security law. In order to make employees and customers think, the Causeway Bay, Mong Kok stores and order pages are temporarily closed.

19 November

Five Eyes Alliance is seriously concerned about the disqualification of legislators 
U.S. Secretary of State Mike Pompeo and the foreign ministers of Canada, Australia, New Zealand and the United Kingdom issued a joint statement, reiterating their serious concerns about the disqualification of legislators of the Legislative Council. The statement criticized the implementation of the Hong Kong national security law and the government's delay in the legislative council elections scheduled to be held in September this year and further weakened Hong Kong's high degree of autonomy and human rights freedom. Under the Basic Law, they have the right to elect representatives and immediately restore the qualifications of the affected legislative council members.

In response to the incident at the press conference, the spokesperson of the Ministry of Foreign Affairs of the People's Republic of China Zhao Lijian stated that the countries concerned violated international law and the basic norms of international relations and expressed strong dissatisfaction and firm opposition. He also stated that "no matter if they have five or ten eyes, as long as they dare to harm China's sovereignty, security, and development interests, be careful that their eyes are poked and blinded."

The Office of Commissioner of the Ministry of Foreign Affairs in Hong Kong criticized the statement.

Ramen yellow shop Betsutenjin truck with protest sticker detained by police for inspection 
The vehicle of the ramen restaurant Betsutenjin was detained for inspection by the traffic police in Causeway Bay for violating the Road Traffic (Construction and Maintenance of Vehicles) Regulations. The car body is covered with the code name of the movement date and the Goddess of Democracy portrait sticker, which is believed by the police to block the light transmittance of the passenger's windows, while the cargo net is not secure. Ramen yellow shop Betsutenjin truck with protest sticker detained by police for inspection.

Chinese University students launch a demonstration 
Dozens of students of the Chinese University of Hong Kong turned their graduation ceremony into a rare protest to commemorate the pro-democracy protests a year earlier. After the protest, the CUHK stated that the gathering and demonstration activities were suspected of violating the Restrictions on Gathering Order and the Public Order Ordinance. The school has already called the police this morning and strongly condemned the violations. National Security Department of the Police Force sent 300 police officers to the campus on the next day to investigate.

20 November

National Security Department went to CUHK to search for evidence 

At about 3 pm, officers from the National Security Department of Police Force, accompanied by university security personnel, entered the CUHK campus to conduct investigations and search evidence, including 30 criminally damaged locations, and photographed multiple exterior walls and pillars. Police officers also entered the dormitory area to investigate. The operation ended at 6 o'clock in the evening, and no one has been arrested. The Chairman of the Provisional Administrative Committee of the Student Union of CUHK, Owen Au Cheuk-hei, was very disappointed in the way the school handled the police and believed that it would undermine the mutual trust between the school and the students. The Chinese University Staff Union and the Union of university and Tertiary Institutions issued a joint statement, strongly condemning the school's practice of reporting to the police. It deeply regretted this as a violation of educational philosophy.

A spokesperson for the Liaison Office of the Central Committee of the Chinese Communist Party said that he firmly supports the SAR government in investigating and punishing suspected violations of the National Security Law in the Chinese University in accordance with the law. It accused the protesters of tarnishing the campus and seriously desecrating the feelings of the vast majority of graduates, relatives and friends.

21 November

Radio host arrested for funding secession 
D100 radio host Wan Yiu-sing (a.k.a. Giggs), his wife and his assistants were arrested by the police for launching the 'A thousand of fathers and mothers: Taiwan education aid programme' crowdfunding campaign to support the anti-revision movement. The security officer was arrested on suspicion of committing the crime of 'money laundering.' Giggs was also involved in 'funding others to split the country with money or other properties.' This is the first time the police have cited the crime of funding secession under the Hong Kong national security law. The Mainland Affairs Council of Taiwan reprimanded the Hong Kong police for "repeating the law and doing nothing to help stabilize the Hong Kong society."

12 Hong Kong family members release balloons 
Accompanied by members of Tsuen Wan District Councilor Lester Shum and Owen Chow, the 12 family members of the arrested Hong Kong people went to Kat O, which is only one sea away from Yantian, to drop balloons towards the detention center and pull up those with "SAVE 12" and "Go Home". Banner, expressing concern about the condition of the children and wishing them to return safely soon. At 2 pm, the marine police arrived at the scene and pointed out that there was a case of 'violation of the gathering restriction order' and recorded the personal data of some people at the scene and two reporters.

721 incident memorial, police officers walked into Yoho Mall 

On 21 November, 15 months after the 721 incident, a large number of police officers deployed heavily at Yuen Long station and the district. In the evening, Adam Ma Chun-man (a.k.a. Captain America 2.0) appeared again in the atrium of Yoho Mall, chanting slogans such as 'Liberate Hong Kong and 'Hong Kong Independence', and sang Glory to Hong Kong three times, during which someone hung up and wrote on the second floor. There are a "721 Unseen People in the 16th Month" poster. Several plainclothes police officers were divided into three teams to take pictures in the surrounding area. In less than ten minutes, more than 30 uniformed police officers wearing helmets walked into the mall in multiple ways, raised the purple flag and pulled up a large-scale cordon around the atrium to intercept and search 'Captain America 2.0'. A large number of police officers continued to patrol the mall, and then once again raised the purple flag. They left the mall at about 7 pm.

In addition, social worker Hendrick Lui played the episode of Hong Kong Connection '7.21 Who Owns the Truth' at the Lennon Wall of Yuen Long West Rail station. During the preparation time, more than 20 uniformed police officers and media liaison teams were present. Lui then transferred to the Fung Yau Street Sitting-out Area to hold a screening. Police officers monitored the scene.

22 November

Captain America 2.0 arrested again in Popcorn mall 
In the evening, Adam Ma Chun-man (a.k.a. Captain America 2.0) alone went to the atrium of PopCorn Mall in Tseung Kwan O to shout slogans and sang Glory to Hong Kong. After that, a large number of uniformed police officers rushed into the mall and raised purple flags, and pulled up a cordon. The police stated that the man was arrested in violation of Article 9 of the Criminal Offences Ordinance for allegedly committing acts with seditious intent.

23 November

Detainment of three young activists 

Former Demosistо̄ members Joshua Wong, Agnes Chow, and former chairman Ivan Lam involved in the siege of the Wan Chai Police Headquarters on 21 June last year. The case opened in the West Kowloon Magistrate Courts. The three have accepted the charges and must be detained immediately and sentenced on December 2. Among them, Chow was detained for the first time.

The incident aroused the attention of the international community. European Union High Representative for Foreign and Security Policy Josep Borrell called Chinese Foreign Minister Wang Yi and emphasized that China should respect Hong Kong's high degree of autonomy under the principle of one country, two systems. Members of the European Parliament also proposed that sanctions must be used to respond to China's repressive actions against human rights and civil society in Hong Kong.

United Kingdom publishes the 2020 Semi-Annual Report on Hong Kong issues 
Department of Foreign and Commonwealth Affairs of the United Kingdom issued the Semi-Annual Report on Hong Kong issues, questioning the Standing Committee of the National People's Congress of China's adoption of the Hong Kong national security law, the disqualification of many legislators, and the promise of 'One Country, Two Systems'. In response, Chinese Foreign Ministry spokesperson Zhao Lijian said on November 24: "In the past, Britain did not give Hong Kong democracy during its colonial rule. Today, Britain is not qualified to be a judge." He also said, "Hong Kong has been returned to the motherland for 23 years, and the British government is still publishing the so-called "Hong Kong Issue Semi-annual Report" to reverse black and white, make irresponsible remarks on Hong Kong affairs and make unreasonable accusations against China. We firmly oppose and strongly condemned this". Hong Kong government and the Chinese Ministry of Foreign Affairs Office in Hong Kong also issued documents opposing this report, believing that the British move was a gross interference in Hong Kong affairs and China's internal affairs.

Four former Demosistо̄ members including Joshua Wong pleaded guilty to 'inciting others to participate in unauthorized assembly' and other crimes in court.

24 November

Emergency Law and Anti-Mask Law constitutional ruling appeal 
About 24 democrats and social activists Leung Kwok-hung, filed a final appeal against the constitutionality of the Emergency Regulations Ordinance and the Prohibition on Face Covering Regulation. In his remarks, Gladys Li, a senior barrister representing the democratic camp, questioned the constitutionality of the ordinance and described the law as a 'missile launcher.'

Captain America 2.0 charged for inciting secession 
The police formally charged the 30-year-old Adam Ma Chun-man (a.k.a. Captain America 2.0), who was arrested 7 times earlier by the police, accusing him of inciting secession in 10 locations and 19 occasions between 15 August and 22 November this year. Ma was suspected of violating the national security law. At the request of the prosecution, Chief Magistrate Victor So, the defendant did not need to reply, and refused to be released on bail, and was remanded until February next year for interrogation. When the defendant left the court, he shouted: "The fruits of democracy are irrigated with blood and sweat".

25 November

Carrie Lam releases 2020 policy address 
Hong Kong Chief Executive Carrie Lam issued the 2020 Policy Address, which mentioned 'One Country, Two Systems', the relevant decisions of the National People's Congress and the national security law. In her report, she said that the situation in Hong Kong had changed to the point that "non-central authorities could not take action." This made it possible to include the national security law in Annex III of the Basic Law and implement it in Hong Kong on the same day. She said that in the past four months, the law has brought significant effects in restoring Hong Kong's stability. The advocacy of 'Hong Kong independence' and collusion with external forces have gradually diminished. Some leading figures have apparently converged, radical organizations have ceased operations or disbanded, and suspected lawbreakers have absconded in fear of crime. On the other hand, street violence has also been greatly reduced. It is said that after a year of social unrest and threats to personal safety, Hong Kong citizens can finally re-enjoy their basic rights and freedoms in accordance with the law.

26 November

Reform of Liberal Studies curriculum content 
Secretary for Education, Kevin Yeung, said that the Liberal Studies subject was stigmatized and decided to reform the content of the subjects in accordance with the purpose and objectives of the curriculum. President of PTU and LegCo educational constituency member, Ip Kin-yuen, believes that if the subject is qualified as a score, students' attention will naturally be reduced, which will affect performance. He criticized the authorities for implementing reforms out of political considerations. the wave of cases is attributed to the General Studies.

Speaking on RTHK 'Accountability' 28 November, Chief Executive Carrie Lam said that the reform of liberal arts is not about politics over majors. From the beginning to the end, she believes that it is professional leading. She also believes that the problems in Hong Kong society are not simply due to individual Subject causes. It was also revealed that the reform of the general education program was not due to pressure from Beijing, and emphasized that there are many problems in the subject itself.

Jimmy Lai sued Ta Kung Pao for defamation 
Founder of Next Digital, Jimmy Lai, filed a lawsuit at High Court, alleging that an article in Ta Kung Pao published in June 2020 entitled 'The leader of the chaotic Hong Kong seeks "grass" route and charges 1 million to be exposed' was defamatory. In addition to requiring the court to issue an injunction to prohibit Ta Kung Pao from slandering anymore, it also asked the other party to pay compensation and publish an apology.

Cary Lo arrested for wasting police force 
A Tuen Mun District Councillor from Democratic Party, Cary Lo, was arrested for fabricating a fictitious investigation of the police at Fung Yau North Street, Yuen Long, on 21 July 2020. The police officers 'held tight backhand and suffered pain' and claimed that the police officers 'intimidated them with foul language'. He was then taken to the Yuen Long Police Station, where he was eventually released unconditionally. However, after investigation by the police, Lo was not arrested by the police or taken to the Yuen Long Police Station that night. He was eventually arrested on suspicion of 'wasting police force' and was released on bail pending further investigation. The police condemned Lo for blatantly lying against the ethics and integrity of public officials, and did not rule out taking legal action to investigate the incident.

27 November

Carrie Lam admits that she has no bank services under US sanctions 
Carrie Lam was asked by reporters during an exclusive interview with the "Talk The Walk" of Hong Kong International Finance and Economics Channel whether she caused any inconvenience after being sanctioned by the US government. She revealed that due to US sanctions, the bank account was to be suspended, and the Hong Kong government used cash to give her food, and said that there were piles of cash at home. However, she said it was an honor to be sanctioned for safeguarding national security. In addition, Lam also accepted an interview with i-Cable News and criticized the new district councils for being "noisy", and said that she was dissatisfied with district councilors who insulted her colleagues, especially police officers, and believed that the district councils deviated from the Basic Law's functions for district organizations.

30 November

Chinese government sanctions U.S. NGO and individuals 
Spokesperson of the Chinese Ministry of Foreign Affairs, Hua Chunying, announced at a regular press conference that China would further sanction the four NGOs who 'behaved badly on Hong Kong-related issues'. They are John Knaus, senior director of the National Endowment for Democracy, Manpreet Anand, a regional director of the National Democratic Institute, Kelvin Sit, the NDI's program director for Hong Kong and Crystal Rosario, a specialist at the NDI.

7 people arrested after 15 months of Prince Edward incident 

In the 15 months after the 831 Prince Edward Station attack, the district councillor earlier quoted news that the police would drive away flower-presenters. In the end, three citizens were voted for littering because of flower-presenting. Since the afternoon, a large number of police officers have deployed and cordoned Prince Edward station with orange tape. Police officers from time to time urging the public not to gather. At 8 pm, the Chormediahk filmed someone on the street chanting the five major demands, disbanding the police force, and no rioters. The police officers chased the citizens. During this period, many police officers walked into Union Square to intercept a man and a woman. The clerk shouted to the two of them, "X you are so old, do what X say!", "I'll fuck you, I'll fuck you!". At 9 pm, 4 members of Student Politicism and 3 citizens were intercepted by police officers on their way to the post office for nearly an hour, and were subsequently arrested on suspicion of illegal assembly.

Ted Hui leaves Hong Kong 
Some netizens reposted a tweet by Uffe Elbaek, a member of the Danish Parliament, in the discussion area, which was a report in the local media, showing that Ted Hui was at the Danish airport at that time. The report stated that Hui has been included in the Beijing blacklist and that this trip may affect China-Denmark relations. Elbaek welcomed Hui to visit Denmark in his post and said that he would try his best to ensure his safety.

Hui confirmed to HK01 that he will leave for Denmark on Monday, 30 November to attend an official interview and will return to Hong Kong this Friday. He has notified the court 72 hours before leaving Hong Kong as required. He also stated that since passengers do not need to be isolated after arriving in Denmark, they have immediately started an official interview trip to attend a local environmental protection meeting. But the night after the incident, HK01 received news that Hui's parents, wife and two young children had left Hong Kong by plane in the evening. He responded on Facebook in the early morning of 3 December. In the incident, he said that he has always believed that the family life of politicians does not need to be explained to the public.

References 

Timeline of the 2019–2020 Hong Kong protests
Lists of protests
2020 timelines